Abdullahi Adekunle Oyedele (born 15 July 1999) is a Nigerian footballer who plays for Remo Stars.

References

External links

1999 births
Living people
Nigerian footballers
Association football midfielders
Nigerian expatriate footballers
Expatriate footballers in Moldova
Expatriate footballers in Belarus
FC Saxan players
FC Slutsk players
Remo Stars F.C. players
Sportspeople from Ibadan